The Detroit Safari (founded as the Detroit Neon) was a member of the Continental Indoor Soccer League that played at The Palace of Auburn Hills. Their owners, the Palace Sports Group were awarded a franchise on November 4, 1993. Their star player and unofficial coach (the CISL prohibited player-coaches) was experienced indoor player Andy Chapman.

The name Detroit Neon was a reference to the Dodge Neon and came from a sponsorship from the Chrysler Corporation like fellow Palace Sports team the International Hockey League Detroit Vipers. In 1997 the naming rights were sold to General Motors and they were named after the GMC Safari minivan. The team folded along with the closing of the Continental Indoor Soccer League after the 1997 season.

During the team's existence, some games (including all 1997 home games) were televised on PASS Sports. They led the league in attendance in their first season (1994) and never placed below fifth in league attendance for a season. During the five seasons that the Neon/Safari played, their average attendance was 6,232.

Ownership
 Palace Sports & Entertainment Group

Staff
 Ron Campbell – General Manager (1994–97)

Head coaches
 Chris Keenan (1994)
 David B. Baker (1994)
 Paul Child (1995–97)
 Ian Fairbrother (1997)

References

Association football clubs established in 1993
Association football clubs disestablished in 1997
Defunct indoor soccer clubs in the United States
Continental Indoor Soccer League teams
S
Soccer clubs in Michigan
Sports in Auburn Hills, Michigan
Sports in Oakland County, Michigan
1993 establishments in Michigan
1997 disestablishments in Michigan